Mirabile is an unincorporated community in Caldwell County, in the U.S. state of Missouri.

History
A post office called Mirabile was established in 1849, and remained in operation until 1941. Mirabile is a name derived from Latin meaning "wonderful".

References

Unincorporated communities in Caldwell County, Missouri
1849 establishments in Missouri
Unincorporated communities in Missouri